Emma Edwards Green, born Emma Sarah Etine Edwards (1856-1942), later known as Mrs. Emma Green, was an American painter and designer. She designed the State Seal of Idaho, used also on the Flag of Idaho, and is the only woman to have designed a state seal.

Biography

Emma Edwards Green was born Emma Sarah Etine Edwards in 1856 to Emma Jeanne Catherine Richard and former Missouri Governor John Cummins Edwards in Stockton, California. In 1890, Emma Edwards Green stopped in Boise, Idaho, to visit friends on her way home from the Arts Students League of New York. She decided to stay in Boise and began teaching art classes. In 1891, Edwards was invited to submit a design for the State Seal competition sponsored by the First Legislature for the State of Idaho. On May 5, 1891, Edwards was awarded $100 by Governor N. B. Willey for her design of the state seal, which depicts a miner, a woman and various natural resources of Idaho. The original seal painting is now held at the Idaho State Historical Society.

A few years after designing the State Seal of Idaho, Edwards married James G. Green. She had no children, but assisted in raising her nephews. Emma Edwards Green died in Boise, Idaho, on January 6, 1942, and was buried with her husband in Oakland, CA.

References

1856 births
1942 deaths
19th-century American women artists
20th-century American women artists
American designers
American women painters
Artists from California
People from Stockton, California